Gidi Kanyuk (born 11 February 1993) is an Israeli professional footballer who plays as a attacking midfielder for Israeli Premier League club Hapoel Haifa.

Early life
Kanyuk was born in Ramat Gan, Israel, to an Ashkenazi Jewish family.

References

1993 births
Living people
Israeli Ashkenazi Jews
Israeli footballers
Maccabi Petah Tikva F.C. players
Pakhtakor Tashkent FK players
Maccabi Tel Aviv F.C. players
Hapoel Haifa F.C. players
Gidi Kanyuk
Gidi Kanyuk
Gidi Kanyuk
Gidi Kanyuk
Israeli Premier League players
Liga Leumit players
Footballers from Ramat Gan
Israeli people of Ukrainian-Jewish descent
Israeli expatriate footballers
Expatriate footballers in Uzbekistan
Expatriate footballers in Thailand
Israeli expatriate sportspeople in Thailand
Israeli expatriate sportspeople in Uzbekistan
Association football midfielders